Blayney Shire is a local government area in the Central West region of New South Wales, Australia. The Shire is located adjacent to the Mid-Western Highway and the Main Western railway line, and is centred on the town of Blayney.

There is also significant mining industry in the shire.

Towns and localities 
Towns and localities within the Blayney Shire are:

Demographics

Council

Current composition and election method
Blayney Shire Council is composed of seven councillors elected proportionally as a single ward. All councillors are elected for a fixed four-year term of office. The mayor is elected by the councillors at the first meeting of the council. The most recent election was held on 4 December 2021, and the makeup of the council is as follows:

The current Council, elected in 2021, in order of election, is:

Proposed amalgamation
The outcome of the independent review was expected to be completed by mid–2016.

See also

List of local government areas in New South Wales

References

External links

 
Local government areas of New South Wales